Kolbotn Idrettslag is a sports club from Kolbotn, Norway.  Since 1960, the club has been organized in semi-autonomous sub-sections.  The club runs basketball, amateur wrestling, association football, sport gymnastics, disabled sports, handball, orienteering, competitive swimming and volleyball.

Currently (2005), these sections exist:

 Kolbotn Gymnastics
 Kolbotn Basketball
 Kolbotn Football
 Kolbotn Handicap
 Kolbotn Handball
 Kolbotn Orienteering
 Kolbotn Swimming
 Kolbotn Volleyball
 Kolbotn Wrestling
 Kolbotn Hunters - American Football

Over the years, the club and its members have also been active in:

 Badminton
 Bandy
 Athletics
 Skiing
 Speedskating

History
Kullebunden Idrætsklub was founded in 1915 with Normand Nilsen as its first chairman.  The club later changed its name to Kolbotn Idrettsklubb (KIK).  Kolbotn Arbeideridrettslag (Kolbotn AIL) was founded in 1924.  In 1934 the speedskaters broke away from KIK and started Kolbotn Skøyteklubb with Wilhelm Berthelsen as chairman.  In 1946 the three clubs, Kolbotn Idrettsklubb, Kolbotn Arbeideridrettslag, and Kolbotn Skøyteklubb merged and took the new name Kolbotn Idrettslag (aka Kolbotn I.L.).  In 1985, Hellerasten Volleyball Klubb was included in Kolbotn I.L.

In 1925 Roald Amundsen, the famous polar explorer, was appointed honorable member of the club.

The club is probably best known for its eminent wrestlers.  Kolbotn wrestlers had a very good period in the 1940s and again in the early 1980s to the mid-1990s.  The most notable results were two Olympic gold medals by Jon Rønningen.

Kolbotn I.L. started Handball in 1940 and the Handball section had its golden years in the early 1980s as they won the National league in 1983 and 1984.

Kolbotn Volleyball won the National league in 1984 (as Hellerasten), and 1986.  In 1992, Kolbotn Volleyball won both the National league and the National championship.

Kolbotn Football has had a very capable women’s team, in the last several years winning the elite Toppserien league in 2002, 2005, and 2006 and the national Cup championship in 2007.  In 2009 Dan Eggen, former Norwegian international player, joined as the team's chief trainer.

References

External links
Official site

Sports teams in Norway
Sport in Akershus
Oppegård
Defunct athletics clubs in Norway
1915 establishments in Norway